The 2022 season of competitive association football in Indonesia.

Promotion and relegation

Name changes 
On 30 May 2022, during the 2022 PSSI Ordinary Congress, six teams had their name change requests accepted by the federation:

Liga 1
 Dewa United removed "Martapura" from its official name, having previously acquired Martapura to play in Liga 2 last season.
 Borneo added their home city of "Samarinda" to their full name, thus becoming Borneo Samarinda.
 TIRA-Persikabo officially changed its name to Persikabo 1973, even though the name was already used for the last season as a commercial arrangement.
 RANS Cilegon changed its name to RANS Nusantara and moved their homebase to Jakarta.

Liga 2
 AHHA PS Pati relocated to Bekasi and were renamed to Bekasi FC However, following a lawsuit by Bekasi FC's original rights holder, the club is subject to another name change, which will be decided in the near future.
Mataram Utama handed over their senior team to a group of investors, who subsequently rebranded the club as Nusantara United. The two clubs exist as separate entities, with Nusantara United taking over Mataram Utama's place in the Liga 2, while Mataram Utama redirected their focus towards youth development and their football academy. On 5 July, revealed that they are now based in Nusantara, the planned new capital of Indonesia.

Club acquisition
Muba Babel United was acquired by Liga 3 side Persipal Palu. As a result, Persipal took over Muba Babel United's place in Liga 2 starting from the 2022-23 season.

Domestic leagues 
After the Kanjuruhan Stadium disaster, where at least 135 people died in a stampede triggered by police usage of tear gas on supporters who were still inside the stadium, Liga 1, Liga 2, and Liga 3 were put on hold. On 6 October 2022, Indonesian police announced six accused, three league related operator and three police officers. The accused operators are: director of PT Liga Indonesia Baru Ahmad Hadi Lukita, Arema match organising committee chairman Abdul Haris, and Arema head of security officer Suko Sutrisno.

Liga 1 

The 2022–23 Liga 1 season (also known as the 2022–23 BRI Liga 1 season for sponsorship reasons) will be the 13th season of the Liga 1, the top Indonesian professional league for association football clubs since its establishment in 2008. The season started on 23 July 2022, with the first match between PSIS and RANS Nusantara which ended draw. Bali United were the two-time defending champions.

National teams

Men's national football team

2020 AFF Championship

2023 AFC Asian Cup qualification

2022 AFF Championship

Men's under-23 football team

2022 AFF U-23 Championship 

Indonesia withdrew from the tournament on 11 February 2022 because seven players tested positive for COVID-19, four others were categorised as suspected COVID-19 cases and three players suffered injuries.

2021 Southeast Asian Games

Men's under-20 football team

2022 Maurice Revello Tournament

2022 AFF U-19 Youth Championship

2023 AFC U-20 Asian Cup qualification

2022 Costa Calida Supercup

Men's under-17 football team

2022 AFF U-16 Youth Championship

2023 AFC U-17 Asian Cup qualification

Women's national football team

2022 AFC Women's Asian Cup

2021 Southeast Asian Games 

On 15 April 2022, Indonesia announced that they will withdraw from the tournament.

2022 AFF Women's Championship

Women's under-20 football team

2022 AFF U-18 Women's Championship

Notes

References